A Murder in Virginia: Southern Justice on Trial is a book by Suzanne Lebsock detailing the cases surrounding the murder of Lucy Pollard in 1895 in Lunenburg County, Virginia.

It won the 2004 Parkman Prize.  Published in 2003, it is the story of three African-American women and a man, Solomon Marable, who in 1895 were accused of ax-murdering a white woman.

References

2003 non-fiction books
W. W. Norton & Company books
1895 in Virginia
Lunenburg County, Virginia
Non-fiction books about murders in the United States
Books about trials
African-American history of Virginia
History of women in Virginia